Sports Center Station may refer to:

 Sports Center Station (Chiba), a station on Line 2 of Chiba Urban Monorail in Chiba, Japan.
 Sports Center station (Luoyang Subway), a station on Line 2 of Luoyang Subway in Luoyang, China.
 Sports Center station (Ningbo Rail Transit), a station on Line 3 of Ningbo Rail Transit in Ningbo, China.
 Sports Center station (Wuhan Metro), a station on Line 3 of Wuhan Metro in Wuhan, China.
 Sports Center station (Shenzhen Metro), a station on Line 6 of Shenzhen Metro in Shenzhen, China.

See also
 Tianhe Sports Center station,  a station on Line 1 of the Guangzhou Metro in Guangzhou, China, with a name in Chinese identical to that of the above Sports Center stations